Piret Jaaks (born 5 August 1980) is an Estonian writer and playwright.

She has graduated from University of Tartu in theatre science. After graduating, she started her doctoral studies at Estonian Academy of Music and Theatre.

She has written several children's plays and these plays are staged at Piip and Tuut Theatre in Tallinn. She has also written children's books.

References

1980 births
Living people
Estonian dramatists and playwrights
21st-century Estonian women writers
Estonian women journalists
Estonian children's writers
Estonian women children's writers
University of Tartu alumni
Estonian Academy of Music and Theatre alumni